The year 1803 in architecture involved some significant architectural events and new buildings.

Buildings and structures

Buildings

 The Raj Bhavan in Kolkata, West Bengal, India.
 Holy Cross Church, Boston, Massachusetts, designed by Charles Bulfinch, dedicated.
 St. John's Chapel (New York City), designed by John McComb, Jr. and his brother Isaac.
 Rivington Unitarian Chapel in Lancashire, England.
 Bob Church, Cluj, Transylvania.
 Casa del Labrador, designed by Isidro González Velásquez, at the Royal Palace of Aranjuez in Spain is completed.
 Nantwich Bridge in Cheshire, England, built by William Lightfoot.

Awards
 Grand Prix de Rome, architecture: François-Narcisse Pagot.

Births
April 3 – David Bryce, Scottish architect (died 1876)
April 20 – Christian Hansen, Danish historicist architect (died 1883)
August 3 – Joseph Paxton, English gardener, architect and MP (died 1865)
October 16 – Robert Stephenson, English railway civil and mechanical engineer (died 1859)
November 29 – Gottfried Semper, German architect, art critic and professor of architecture (died 1879)

Deaths
date unknown – Ottone Calderari, Italian architect and writer (born 1730)

References

Architecture
Years in architecture
19th-century architecture